My Wife is a Gangster 2: The Return Fable is a 2003 South Korean film. It is the sequel to My Wife is a Gangster and is itself followed by My Wife Is a Gangster 3.

Plot 
In the beginning of the movie the Scissor gang are fighting some unknown gang on the rooftop. The other gang starts to get the upper hand and are about to kill Robocop but he is saved by Eun-jin (Shin Eun-kyung), the Scissor gang's boss also known as 'Silverfish'. However, during the fight she falls from the top of the building. Due to a lucky break, the fall doesn't kill her, but it does cause her to suffer amnesia. Luckily for Eun-jin, she's found by Choi Yoon-jae (Park Jun-gyu), the kindly owner of a small-scale Chinese restaurant. She worked as a delivery girl under the name of Tsu Tsu. She tries several times to regain her memory but fails in each attempt.

During one of her deliveries, she happens to be at the bank which is being put under heist when one of the robber starts kicking a pregnant woman. Regaining a part of her memory about she getting kicked by Nanman, she then beats up all three of the robbers and prevents the bank robbery.

Meanwhile, the White Shark from earlier movie along with his several henchmen has survived the fire and have returned to the neighborhood. He plans to demolish the buildings from the neighborhood of Yoon-jae's restaurant and build a big mall there, but he happens to see Eun-jin as she is being awarded for her bravery of preventing a bank robbery. He inquires about her and learns from a local hoodlum that she is working as a delivery girl. He asks the hoodlum to make an order so that they may get to know her. But when she appears with the delivery he immediately recognizes her as the 'Silverfish' and hires Jun-man, brother of Nanman, to kill her.

Once, in a feud with Ji-hyun, Tsu Tsu fell from the roof and recovered her past memories with White Shark, who had recruited Jun-man to kill her. Jun-man became impotent when Yoon-jae's motorbike accidentally hit him in the groin. Ji-hyun was later kidnapped by the White Shark gang and they call Yoon-jae and threaten him to sell his daughter to brothel if he doesn't tell them about Eun-jin's whereabouts. When Eun-jin hears of these events she goes to save Ji-hyun but while she was being rescued by Eun-jin, Yoon-jae gets stabbed in the stomach and killed. Eun-jin was saved by the 132-members of the Scissor gang. Ji-hyun later joined Eun-jin's gang to fight against some Chinese illegal drug dealers. Zhang Ziyi appears in cameo in a short fight scene at the end of the film.

Cast 
 Shin Eun-kyung as Cha Eun-jin
 Park Jun-gyu as Yun Jae-cheol
 Jang Se-jin
 Ryu Hyun-kyung
 Hyun-kyung
 Joo Hyun
 Jo Mi-ryung
 Choi Joon-yong
 Kim Seung-wook
 Kim Tae-hoon-I
 Shim Won-cheol
 Lee Ki-yeol
 Kim Gyung-ae
 Jo Sun-mook
 Byun Joo-yun
 Sun-Woo Sun
 Kim Kyung-ryong
 Go Gwan-jae
 Oh Sang-hoon-I
 Lee In-ok
 Kim Tae-ok
 Hong Soo-ah
 Hong Seung-il
 Kim Jin-yang
 Choi Hae-cheol

 Guest appearance
 Kim Young-ho
 Lee Won-jong
 Choi Eun-joo
 Ryu Shi-hyun
 Choi Wang-soon

External links
 
 

2003 films
2000s Korean-language films
Films about organized crime in South Korea
South Korean crime comedy films
South Korean gangster films
South Korean black comedy films
South Korean sequel films
2003 black comedy films
2000s crime comedy films
2000s South Korean films